Robeline is a village in western Natchitoches Parish, Louisiana, United States. The population was 183 at the 2000 census. It is part of the Natchitoches Micropolitan Statistical Area.

History 
Robeline was the capital of Texas for 50 years. Robeline was owned by the Spanish and a creek formed the border between Spanish Texas and French Louisiana. During 1870-1917, a railroad was built through Robeline and Marthaville, Louisiana. The town was rich with resources and money, but the railroad was abandoned in 1960, and Robeline declined. It now has a convenience store, dollar store, several churches, and considerable wilderness.

According to a 2007 report, Robeline was named one of the ten worst speed traps in the state of Louisiana. Robeline made 85.73 percent of its revenue, an average of roughly $1,517 per capita population, from fines and forfeitures in the 2005 fiscal year.

In the 1880s, Robeline had a weekly newspaper, the Robeline Reporter.

Geography 

Robeline is located at  (31.690873, -93.304233).

According to the United States Census Bureau, the village has a total area of 1.0 square miles (2.6 km), all land.

Demographics 

As of the census of 2000, there were 183 people, 76 households, and 48 families residing in the village. The racial makeup of the village was 77.05% White, 17.49% African American and 5.46% Native American. Hispanic or Latino of any race were 2.19% of the population.

There were 76 households, out of which 28.9% had children under the age of 18 living with them, 46.1% were married couples living together, 14.5% had a female householder with no husband present, and 36.8% were non-families. 34.2% of all households were made up of individuals, and 15.8% had someone living alone who was 65 years of age or older. The average household size was 2.41 and the average family size was 3.13.

In the village, the population was spread out, with 25.7% under the age of 18, 6.6% from 18 to 24, 27.9% from 25 to 44, 21.3% from 45 to 64, and 18.6% who were 65 years of age or older. The median age was 38 years. For every 100 females, there were 94.7 males. For every 100 females age 18 and over, there were 103.0 males.

The median income for a household in the village was $13,036, and the median income for a family was $24,583. Males had a median income of $28,750 versus $14,375 for females. The per capita income for the village was $10,468. About 28.6% of families and 38.3% of the population were below the poverty line, including 5.9% of those under the age of eighteen and 34.0% of those 65 or over.

Education
Natchitoches Parish School Board  operates area public schools.
The former Robeline public school (Mascot was the Bulldogs) closed in 1980 because of a federal desegregation order. Elementary pupils were consolidated with nearby Marthaville; high schoolers were bused to Natchitoches Central High School.

Parks and recreation 
Robeline is home of the annual Robeline Heritage Festival held the first weekend of October. Past performers have included several local musicians as well as Percy Sledge.

Notable people

 Bartine Burkett, silent film actress 
 Milton Joseph Cunningham, served three nonconsecutive terms as Attorney General of Louisiana prior to 1900

See also 

 Los Adaes

References

External links 

Villages in Louisiana
Villages in Natchitoches Parish, Louisiana
Populated places in Ark-La-Tex